YYOGA is a yoga, fitness, and wellness company based in Vancouver, British Columbia. It is the original network yoga company in Canada. Terry McBride founded the company in 2007. McBride is the CEO.

History
In 2007, Nettwerk music executive, entrepreneur and yogi Terry McBride founded YYOGA. The company was founded with the intention to create a community of yoga studio and lifestyles centres whose schedules fit better into peoples lifestyles. 

In 2019, the company launched YYOGA at Home, which offers thousands of on-demand virtual classes. Subscription is offered monthly or annually.

Unfortunately, due to impacts from COVID, YYOGA permanently closed a couple of locations and now operates 5 studios in the Lower Mainland, including Vancouver, North Vancouver and Richmond.

References

2007 establishments in British Columbia
Companies based in Vancouver
Entertainment companies established in 2007
Yoga organizations
Canadian companies established in 2007